Seánie O'Farrell (born 1977) is an Irish retired hurler who played as a right corner-forward for the Cork senior team.

Born in Carrigtwohill, County Cork, O'Farrell first arrived on the inter-county scene at the age of seventeen when he first linked up with the Cork minor team, before later joining the under-21 side. He joined the senior panel during the 1998 National Hurling League. O'Farrell won one National Hurling League medal.

At club level O'Farrell is a three-time championship medallist with Imokilly GAA in 1997 and 1998 and in 2011 with Carrigtwohill GAA.

Honours

Team

Carrigtwohill
Cork Senior Hurling Championship (1): 2011

Cork
National Hurling League (1): 1998
All-Ireland Intermediate Hurling Championship (1): 1997
All-Ireland Under-21 Hurling Championship (2): 1997, 1998
Munster Under-21 Hurling Championship (2): 1997, 1998
All-Ireland Minor Hurling Championship (1): 1995
Munster Minor Hurling Championship (1): 1995

References

1977 births
Living people
Carrigtwohill hurlers
Cork inter-county hurlers